Nic, Nick, Nicky or Nicholas Reid may refer to:

 Nic Reid (born 1995), Australian rules footballer
 Nick Reid (born 1983), American football linebacker
 Nicky Reid (born 1960), English footballer defender
 Nicholas Bruce Reid (politician) (1935 – 2020), Australian politician